is a Japanese holding company for various entertainment companies. Its subsidiaries include the talent agency Up-Front Promotion and Up-Front Works, a music production and sales company that manages such record labels as Zetima, Piccolo Town, and Hachama.

Artists

Up-Front Promotion
All groups under Up-Front Promotion are collectively known as Hello! Project.

Groups
 Morning Musume
 Angerme
 Juice=Juice
 Camellia Factory
 Beyooooonds
 Chica#Tetsu
 Rain Forest River Ocean
 SeasoningS
 Ocha Norma

Soloists/Entertainers
 Sayumi Michishige
 Chinami Tokunaga
 Risako Sugaya

Trainees
 Hello Pro Kenshūsei

Up-Front Works

Groups
 Bitter & Sweet
 Brothers 5
 Dream Morning Musume
 Lovendor
 Pink Cres.
 Sharam Q
 Up Up Girls Kakko Kari

Soloists/Entertainers
 Ai Takahashi
 Airi Suzuki
 Akira Inaba
 Akira Kagawa
 Chisato Moritaka
 Chisato Okai
 Eric Fukusaki
 Erina Mano
 Gen Takayama
 Hirofumi Bannba
 Jirou Sugita
 Junko Yanagisawa

 Kan
 Mai Satoda
 Maimi Yajima
 Mari Yaguchi
 Miki Fujimoto
 Natsumi Abe
 Nozomi Tsuji
 Saki Nakajima
 Shoko Aida
 Takao Horiuchi
 Tsunku
 You Kikkawa
 Yuko Nakazawa

Subsidiaries

Zetima 

In April 1998, Up-Front merged One Up with Y.J. Sounds to form Zetima. At the same time, Up-Front ended its distribution deal with Warner Music Japan and switched to Sony Music Entertainment Japan.

Artists
 Shoko Aida
 Beyooooonds
 Camellia Factory
 Hello! Project shuffle units
 Akira Inaba
 Jōjō Gundan
 Kan
 Aya Matsuura
 Chisato Moritaka
 Morning Musume
 Takui Nakajima
 Yuko Nakazawa
 Pink Cres.
 Airi Suzuki

Former artists
 Buono!
 Cute
 Dream Morning Musume
 Lovendor
 Ongaku Gatas
 Sharam Q

Hachama 

 has a distribution deal with Pony Canyon.

Artists
 Angerme
 Juice=Juice
 Akari Uemura

Former artists
 Alma Kaminiito
 Eric Fukusaki
 Gatas Brilhantes H.P.
 Yuubi Matsui
 Peaberry

Piccolo Town 

 had a distribution deal with King Records from April 2001 to August 2013, when it switched to Pony Canyon in September 2013.

Artists
 Bitter & Sweet

Former artists
 Aa!
 Berryz Kobo
 Ciao Bella Cinquetti
 Gomattō
 Maki Goto
 Sayaka Ichii
 Yui Okada
 v-u-den
 ZYX

Rice Music 

After being absorbed into Zetima in 1998, the label was resurrected in September 2004 to focus on Kayōkyoku and enka. Like Piccolo Town, Rice Music had a distribution deal with King Records from September 2004 to August 2013, when it switched to Pony Canyon in September 2013.

Artists
 Hirofumi Banba
 Takao Horiuchi
 Akira Kagawa
 Jirō Sugita
 Gen Takayama
 Masayuki Yuhara

Former artists
 Akira Fuse
 Sanae Jōnouchi
 Yuki Maeda
 Nori Yamaguchi

Up-Front Works 

 is Up-Front Group's in-house label that specializes in limited edition releases that are sold either online or exclusively at music chains such as Tower Records. The label previously had distribution deals with Pony Canyon, Daiki Sound, and Universal Music Japan before 2019.

Artists
 Natsumi Abe
 Akira Inaba
 You Kikkawa
 Hello! Project
 Kamiishinaka Kana
 Sayumi Michishige
 Karin Miyamoto
 Chisato Moritaka
 Saki Nakajima
 Asahi Tasaki
 Temiyamn
 Maimi Yajima

Up-Front Indies 

 is Up-Front Group's indie in-house label founded in May 2019.

Artists
 Hello Pro Kenshusei

Chichūkai Label 

 was founded in 2003, with music inspired by those of the countries by the Mediterranean Sea, most prominently France, Italy and Greece, or even cover versions of songs from those countries. The label was handled by Epic Records Japan until December 2009, when Up-Front consolidated it with Zetima.

Former artists
 Shoko Aida
 Kaori Iida
 Akira Inaba
 Noriko Katō
 Yasuko Naito
 Ruca
 Hidemi Sasaki

Former artists

Affiliated with Up-Front Promotion
 Michiyo Heike (1997-2001)
 Morning Musume
 Asuka Fukuda (1997-1999)
 Aya Ishiguro (1997-2000)
 Sayaka Ichii (1998-2000)
 Maki Goto (1999-2007)
 Kei Yasuda (1998-2003)
 Eri Kamei (2003-2010)
 Jun Jun (2007-2010)
 Lin Lin (2007-2010)
 Kanon Suzuki (2011-2016)
 Haruka Kudo (2011-2017)
 Riho Sayashi (2011-2018)
Haruna Iikubo (2011-2018)
Haruna Ogata (2014-2018)
 Chinatsu Miyoshi (1999-2000)
 T&C Bomber (1999-2000)
 Atsuko Inaba (1999-2009)
 Melon Kinenbi (1999-2010)
 Aya Matsuura (2000-2017)
 Sheki-Dol (2000-2002)
 W (2004-2006)
 Ai Kago (2000-2007)
 Coconuts Musume (1998-2008)
 Chelsea Ching (1998-2000)
 April Barbaran (1998-2000)
 Danielle DeLaunay (1998-2001)
 Lehua Sandbo (2000-2002)
 Mika Todd (1998-2004)
 Ayaka Kimura (1998-2008)
 Country Musume (1999-2000)
 Hiromi Yanagihara (1999)
 Azusa Kobayashi (1999-2002)
 Rinne Toda (1999-2002)
 Asami Kimura (2000-2007)
 Miuna Saito (2003-2007)

 Rika Ishii (2001-2002)
 SINA (2008-2011)
 Manami Iwashima (2005-2011)
 Asami Abe (2005-2011)
 Ai Suma (2005-2011)
 Nana Nakayama (2005-2009)
 Shim Min (2003-2006)
 V-u-den (2004-2008)
 Yui Okada (2004-2010)
 Hello! Project Kids (2002-2005)
 Berryz Kobo (2004-2014)
 Maiha Ishimura (2002-2005)
 Momoko Tsugunaga (2002-2017)
 Cute (2005-2017)
 Megumi Murakami (2002-2006)
 Kanna Arihara (2004-2009)
 Erika Umeda (2002-2009)
 Mai Hagiwara (2002-2017)
 Miki Korenaga (2004-2010)
 Angerme
 Saki Ogawa (2009-2011)
 Yuuka Maeda (2009-2011)
 Fuyuka Kosuga (2011)
 Kanon Fukuda  (2009-2019)
Meimi Tamura (2011–2016)
Maho Aikawa (2014–2017)
Kana Nakanishi (2011–2019)
Rina Katsuta (2011–2019)
Ayaka Wada (2009–2019)
Mizuki Murota (2014-2020)
 Country Girls (2014-2019)
Uta Shimamura (2014-2015)
Nanami Yanagawa (2014-2019)
Risa Yamaki (2014-2019)
Mai Ozeki (2014-2019)
 Magnolia Factory (2015-2020)
Rio Fujii (2015-2017)
Rena Ogawa (2015-2017)
Natsumi Taguchi (2015-2017)
Ayaka Hirose (2015-2020)
Minami Nomura (2015-2020)
Ayano Hamaura (2015-2020)
Sakurako Wada (2015-2020)
Sub-units
 Petitmoni (1999-2013)
 Tanpopo (1999-2011)
 Minimoni (2000-2004)
 Morning Musume Sakuragumi (2003-2004)
 Morning Musume Otomegumi (2003-2004)
 Morning Musume Tanjō 10nen Kinentai (2007)
 Buono! (2007-2017)

 Project groups
 Gomattou (2002)
 Romans (2003)
 Tomoiki Ki wo Uetai (2005-2013)
 Rie Kaneko (2009-2013)
 Asuna Okai (2009-2010)
 Mia Sainen (2009-2010)
 Kaori Sano (2009-2010)
 Ongaku Gatas (2007-2010)
 Arisa Noto (2004-2009)
 Yuri Sawada (2004-2009)
 Nochiura Natsumi (2004-2005)
 Ecomoni (2004-2007)
 Aa! (2003-2009)
 ZYX (2003-2009)
 Def.Diva (2005-2007)
 GAM (2006-2009)
 Athena & Robikerottsu (2007-2008)
 Kira Pika (2007)
 MilkyWay (2008-2009)
 Sayaka Kitahara (2004-2011)
 High-King (2008-2015)
 Shugo Chara Egg! (2008-2010)
 Irori Maeda (2008-2010)
 Guardians 4 (2009-2010)
 Lilpri (2010-2011)
Shuffle units
 Kiiro 5 (2000)
 Aoiro 7 (2000)
 Akagumi 4 (2000)
 3-nin Matsuri (2001)
 7-nin Matsuri (2001)
 10-nin Matsuri (2001)
 Happy 7 (2002)
 Sexy 8 (2002)
 Odoru 11 (2002)
 Salt5 (2003)
 7Air (2003)
 11Water (2003)
 H.P. All Stars (2004)
 Elegies (2005)
 Sexy Otonajan (2005)
 Puripuri Pink (2005)
 Hello! Project Mobekimasu (2011-2013)

Affiliated with Up-Front Works

 Hitomi Yoshizawa (2000-2009)
 Rika Ishikawa (2000-2009)
 Asami Konno (2001-2011)
 Makoto Ogawa (2001-2009)
 Saki Shimizu (2002-2017)
 Maasa Sudou (2002-2015)
 Yurina Kumai (2002-2015)
 Koharu Kusumi (2005-2016)

 Up Up Girls Kakko Kari
 Minami Sengoku (2004-2017)
 Aika Mitsui (2006-2018)
 Ships (2008-2009)
 Alma Kaminiito (2012-2013)
 Munehiko Ohno (2012-2013)
 Team Makenki (2014-2018)
 Ciao Bella Cinquetti (2008-2018)

Affiliated with TNX

All of the musical groups under TNX are collectively known as Nice Girl Project!.

 Nice Girl Myu
 GTT Club
 MM Gakuen Gasshoubu
 Gyaruru
 Ami Tokito
 Nice Girl Project! Kenshusei
 Canary Club
 Tokky

References

External links 
 

 
Mass media companies based in Tokyo
Holding companies established in 1983
Conglomerate companies based in Tokyo
Multinational companies headquartered in Japan
Holding companies based in Tokyo
Hello! Project
Labels distributed by CJ E&M Music and Live
Japanese talent agencies
Japanese record labels
Japanese companies established in 1983